Ošljak or Oshlak is a mountain in the south of Kosovo. It is 2,212 m high. Ošljak has steep slopes and its eastern side is connected to the Šar Mountains and its western side is connected to Jezerska planina.

References

Mountains of Kosovo